The Theoretical Roman Archaeology Conference (TRAC) is an academic organisation and conference which was designed to be an arena for open discussion of archaeological theory in Roman archaeology.

History
TRAC, organised initially by Eleanor Scott, was held for the first time in the Department of Archaeology at the University of Newcastle on 23–24 March 1991.

Historically, one of TRAC's main focuses has been on the debates surrounding Romanisation, and this dominated many of the volumes during the 1990s. However, since the early 2000s, there have been a rising number of discussions relating to post-imperial and post-colonial approaches to the Roman world.

TRAC was originally established as a one-off event, but, the interest that this conference garnered led to it becoming an annual fixture. After the initial meeting in Newcastle, TRAC has been run at many of the major archaeology departments in the UK and has even been organised at institutions in Europe and America.

TRAC was joined with RAC (the Roman Archaeology Conference), organised by the Roman Society, at Reading University in 1995.

Participants
Many of the participants in TRAC are early career scholars or postgraduates who use the conference to outline their own original research and attempt to re-define existing models about the Roman past.

Andrew Gardner, in an article in TRAC 2005, raised the issue of a gender imbalance in the history of TRAC conferences. However, in more recent article, Eleanor Scott concluded that TRAC had given an equal platform to female archaeologists working within Roman archaeology. In the 2010s, TRAC has becoming increasingly international.

Annual Meeting Locations

Publications
TRAC was previously published as a set of conference proceedings. From TRAC 2017 it  moved to an online open access journal, the Theoretical Roman Archaeology Journal, published by the Open Library of Humanities.

Subjects
Romanisation
Post-colonial archaeology
Gender and material cultural
Material cultural theory

References

External links 

 Theoretical Roman Archaeology Journal
 Theoretical Roman Archaeology Conference

Archaeological organizations
1991 establishments in the United Kingdom